Awdhesh Mishra (born 5 August 1969) is an Indian actor who primarily works in Bhojpuri-language films, mainly in negative roles. He has worked as main villain in several Bhojpuri films, south Indian Movies and Bollywood as well.

Career
Awdhesh Mishra started his career as a theatre artist from Patna theatre.

In 2005 he made his in film acting debut as a villain in the Bhojpuri movie Dulha Aisan Chahi directed by sunil sinha and his performance was praised by critics.

He did the film Ganga Devi in (2012).

Tamil debut film is Poojai in 2014 Tamil-language action masala film written and directed by Hari and produced by Vishal. 

His Hindi debut film was Dirty Politics in 2015 Hindi-language Indian political thriller film written and directed by K. C. Bokadia.

Filmography

Direction

Web series

References

External links
 
 

Living people
1969 births
Male actors in Bhojpuri cinema
Male actors from Bihar
Indian male film actors